Asuogyaman District is one of the thirty-three districts in Eastern Region, Ghana. Originally created as an ordinary district assembly in 1988, which it was created from the former Kaoga District Council. The district assembly is located in the eastern part of Eastern Region and has Atimpoku as its capital town.

Akosombo Dam
Asuogyaman District is the location of a hydroelectric dam in South Ghana, the Akosombo Dam, in the town of Akosombo. Additionally, the district has some very notable tourist sites apart from the Akosombo Dam, including Dodi Island, Akosombo Port and Dodi Princess that takes tourists on a cruise. The District has within its catchment areas some beautiful hotels such as Volta Hotel, Afrikiko River Resort, and The Royal Senchi.

List of settlements

Sources
 
 Districts: Asuogyaman District

References

Districts of the Eastern Region (Ghana)